Dennis Stojković (Serbian Cyrillic: Денис Стојковић; born 3 August 2002) is a Serbian footballer who plays as a midfielder for Rijeka.

Career

Early career
Stojković spent his youth career with several of Europe's prominent clubs, including Juventus, Torino, and Chelsea.

Partizan
In August 2020, Stojković penned his first professional contract with Serbian club Partizan, signing a four year deal. He made his professional debut for the club on 9 August 2020, coming on as a 78th-minute substitute for Seydouba Soumah in a 4-0 victory over Javor Ivanjica.

Torino
On 19 July 2021 he returned to Torino.

Rijeka
After he terminated contract with Torino at the end of 2021, he was announced as a new player of Rijeka on 1 April 2022 for which he debuted in a friendly match against Celje on 25 March 2022 scoring a goal.

Career statistics

Club

References

External links
Profile at UEFA

2002 births
Living people
Serbian footballers
Serbia youth international footballers
Association football midfielders
FK Partizan players
Torino F.C. players
HNK Rijeka players
Serbian SuperLiga players
Serbian expatriate footballers
Expatriate footballers in Italy
Expatriate footballers in Croatia